Avelino Palma (born 28 February 1948) is a Brazilian sports shooter. He competed in the mixed trap event at the 1984 Summer Olympics.

References

External links
 

1948 births
Living people
Brazilian male sport shooters
Olympic shooters of Brazil
Shooters at the 1984 Summer Olympics
People from Ribeirão Preto
Sportspeople from São Paulo (state)